Sir Robert Ian Bellinger,  (10 March 1910 – 8 July 2002) was a British politician and Lord Mayor of London.

Bellinger was born in Gloucestershire and raised in Fulham, London where he attended All Saints church school. Following his father's death he started work at the age of 14 as an office boy. He studied accountancy at the Regent Street Polytechnic before joining Kinloch, the wholesale grocery. He rose through the ranks to become chairman in 1946, a post which he held until retirement in 1975. 

He joined the Worshipful Company of Broderers in 1946, and was elected onto the Court of Common Council seven years later. An Alderman in 1958 he became Sheriff of the City of London in 1962 and finally Lord Mayor (and with it, the ex officio title of Chancellor of City University) in 1966.

He was a Governor of the BBC and chairman of the Panel for Civil Service Manpower Review. From 1969 to 1985 he served as Gentleman Usher of the Purple Rod of the Order of the British Empire. In 1970, he was named as chairman of the National Savings Committee.

He was a keen sportsman, playing for Ealing Football Club in his youth, and was president of several Buckinghamshire sports clubs. He was also a longtime director of Arsenal Football Club from 1960 until 1996. On his retirement as a director of Arsenal he was appointed Life President, a title he held until his death in 2002.

References

1910 births
2002 deaths
20th-century lord mayors of London
20th-century English politicians
Sheriffs of the City of London
Arsenal F.C. directors and chairmen
BBC Governors
Knights Grand Cross of the Order of the British Empire
People from Fulham
Sportspeople from Gloucestershire
Sportspeople from London